A greenskeeper is a person responsible for the upkeep of a golf course.

Work description and duties 
Greenskeepers are responsible for maintaining all golf course or country club's grounds plain (this includes all horticultural practices, as well as the setting of pins and marking of hazards for regular club play and tournament play). Greenskeepers often work under the direction of a Golf Course Superintendent or Director of Golf Course Operations. For a Greenskeeper, experience and capability are far more important than formal education.

Measuring green speed with a stimpmeter 
Greenskeepers measure the "speed" of golf greens with a stimpmeter, a device used to compare green speed within a facility to ensure consistency. Stimpmeter readings are not used to compare one facility with another; many factors including design, undulation, and grass type affect green speed. The tool measures how fast a green allows the golf ball to travel. A greenskeeper can increase the speed of the green in the following ways: mowing the grass shorter, mowing more than once in multiple directions, use of a lightweight roller, or topdressing the green with a small amount of fine sand to alter the putting surface.

Setting the pins for play 

Setting pins and tee markers are responsibilities that distinguish greenskeepers from other groundskeepers and horticulturists.

Tee markers distinguish the line from which players tee-off or strike the golf ball. Pins (also called flagsticks) mark the location of the hole for which the players are aiming.

Distance between the tee marker and pin affects difficulty and gameplay. Almost every golf course is measured and rated according to distance, often measured in yardage. It is the greenskeeper's responsibility to keep the cumulative yardage for daily play close to the rating for the course. However, guidelines are not exact and movement of pins is largely left to the greenskeeper's discretion.

For general play, some pin placements are easy, some challenging, and some difficult. Pins set closer to the fairway do not necessarily provide an easier shot, for example if there is a bunker (sand trap) immediately in front of the green.

Pins are set in an upright or "plumb" position, at 90 degrees to a horizontal plane. Pins are not perpendicular to the green surface because green surface is not usually level. In order to place a pin, greenskeepers use a cup-cutting tool. Soil is saved to repair the previous hole. Then, a cup-setter tool is used to place top of the cup about 1 inch (25 mm) below the green's surface.

Due to wear and tear, pins are often moved daily during the summer season. New pin locations are at least 12 to 20 feet (3.7 to 6.1 meters) from the previous location.

Other tasks 
Other responsibilities typically required of a greenskeeper include raking the bunkers, watering plants, repairing divots made by shots, trimming tee boxes, and mowing the course.

Right of way 
It is forbidden to hit a ball onto the green when a greenskeeper is there unless they clearly indicate  otherwise. Generally, golfers have the right of way on a golf course, and workers will wait or yield to players. If a greenskeeper is on the green and the pin is out, however, they have the right of way.

Further reading 
 Stimpmeter Instruction Booklet at the USGA.
 Guide to building and maintaining putting greens
 About the concept of "homeowner" greenskeepers

See also
Groundskeeping#Groundskeeping equipment
Turf management#Golf courses

References

Golf people

Sports occupations and roles
Horticulture
Lawn care